Rahima is a female Arabic given name meaning "merciful, kind, compassionate". The male form is Rahim, and is one of the names of Allah in Islam.

Given name
Rahima Moosa (1922–1993), South African activist
Rahima Banu (born 1973), Bangladeshi woman who is the last known person to have been infected with naturally occurring Variola major smallpox
Rahima Begum (born 1984), English human rights activist
Rahima Naz (born 1986), Pakistani poet
 Rahimah Rahim (singer, born 1955), singer from Singapore
 Rahimah Rahim (singer, born 1992), Singaporean singer from Taiwan

Surname
Abdel Amir Abbud Rahima, Iraqi politician

Arabic feminine given names
Bosnian feminine given names
Pakistani feminine given names